Can I Borrow a Dollar? is the debut studio album by American rapper Common Sense. It was released on October 6, 1992, by Relativity Records. The album was entirely produced by No I.D. (then called Immenslope) and The Twilite Tone, with additional production by The Beatnuts, and includes guest vocals from Immenslope, Miss Jones and Common's then-girlfriend Rayshel. Entertainment Weekly'''s Neil Drumming described it as "a clever but little-noticed first album".

 Overview 
 Background 
In 1991, a feature was written about Common in the Unsigned Hype section of The Source. Relativity Records soon signed Common, and prepared to release three singles for his debut album. The first and best-charting single was 1992's "Take It EZ". It reached #5 on the Hot Rap Singles chart while his next two singles, "Breaker 1/9" and "Soul by the Pound," reached #10 and #7 respectively. All of these singles combined to give Common a strong underground reputation prior to the album's release.

 Content Can I Borrow A Dollar? shows Common's early style of rapping; namely a sing-songy and inflection-heavy vocal delivery, as well as lyrics packed with word play and popular culture allusions.
The album's production, utilizing samples, keyboards, and drum breaks prominently, tends to be minimalistic, jazzy and laid back. The Source'' called the production top notch.
Although receiving a lukewarm reception, Stanton Swihart of Allmusic considers it to have put Chicago hip hop on the map and to be an underrated debut album.

Track listing 
All tracks produced by Immenslope & The Twilite Tone, except track 4 produced by The Beatnuts

Chart positions

Album chart positions

Singles chart positions

References 

1992 debut albums
Common (rapper) albums
Relativity Records albums
Albums produced by No I.D.